Oxford Royale Academy (also known as ORA and ORA Education) is an educational organisation based in Oxford, United Kingdom.

History
ORA Education was established in 2004 by alumni of the Universities of Oxford, Cambridge and London. The organisation was founded in the city of Oxford, where it has provided educational courses each summer since it was established.

ORA Education is now based at St Catherine's College, one of the constituent colleges of the University of Oxford. ORA was located at Yarnton Manor, in Yarnton, Oxfordshire, between 2014 and 2021. ORA acquired Yarnton Manor from the Oxford University Centre for Hebrew and Jewish Studies in September 2014.

Awards 
ORA Education was included in the list of winners of the Queen's Awards for Enterprise 2012, in the International Trade category. This was in recognition of growing student enrolments.

ORA Education won a second Queen's Awards for Enterprise in 2016 and a third in 2019.

It was also awarded Best Educational Product at the annual British Youth Travel Awards in 2010, 2011, 2012, 2013 and 2015. ORA was chosen based on a range of criteria including customer service; quality of content; creativity in business thinking; improving or innovating a product; and commitment to health and safety.

ORA Education was also named as a finalist for this award in 2016 and 2017.

ORA is accredited by the British Council and the British Accreditation Council (BAC), and is a member of the World Youth Student & Educational Travel Confederation (WYSE), EnglishUK and StudyUK. In February 2012, Oxford Royale Academy became a supporting member of the Council of British International Schools.

ORA Education recently gained accreditation from City and Guilds, one of the world's mainstream accreditation providers.

Oxbridge campuses 
ORA Education contracts with institutions including the University of Oxford for the use of their facilities and also contracts with tutors from the institution but does not operate under the aegis of the University.

In Oxford, ORA students reside in St. Peter's College, St. Catherine's College, Balliol College (including their Jowett Walk annexe), St Hugh's College, Merton College, University College, Lady Margaret Hall, and The Queen's College.

In Cambridge, St Catharine's College, Clare College, St Edmund's College form the three current colleges where ORA students can live and take classes.

In addition to operating its summer courses in Oxford, Oxford Royale also offers summer programmes in Cambridge, London, Ascot and St Andrews in the UK. For the first time in July 2018, ORA also offered programs in the USA, including courses at Yale University and Stanford University.

References

External links
Official website

Educational institutions established in 2004
2004 establishments in England